Coloane Park is a large park located on the southern section of Coloane Island in the former Portuguese colony of Macau, now a Special Administrative Region of the People's Republic of China. 

Features of the park include:

 Coloane Hiking Trail
 picnic areas
 Goddess A-Ma statue (19.99m)
 fishing
 Coloane Peak (170m)

See also
 List of tourist attractions in Macau

Urban public parks in Macau
Coloane